Past Go: Collected is an album by Peter Hammill, originally released on Fie! Records in 1996.

The album is a selection of Hammill's songs from some of his earlier albums in the Fie! catalogue.

Track listing
All songs written by Peter Hammill.
"A Kick to Kill the Kiss"
"I Will Find You"
"Accidents"
"His Best Girl"
"Sharply Unclear"
"Patient"
"Planet Coventry"
"A Ritual Mask"
"The Noise"
"The Gift of Fire"
"Traintime"
"Gaia"
"Your Tall Ship"

Personnel 

Peter Hammill – vocals, guitar, keyboards
Manny Elias - drums, percussion
Guy Evans - drums, percussion
Nic Potter - bass
John Ellis - guitar
Stuart Gordon - violin
David Jackson - saxophones, flutes
David Lord - keyboards, arrangements
Simon Clarke - Hammond organ

References

Peter Hammill albums
1996 compilation albums